The President of the New Zealand Labour Party is the highest-ranked organisational figure within the New Zealand Labour Party. The president heads the party apparatus outside of parliament, serving as the chairperson of the party's council and policy council. Since 2022, the office has been held by Jill Day.

Role
The president is elected by the party delegates at the Labour Party annual conference or, if an early vacancy occurs, a by-election via postal ballot. The president is the chair of the party's governing body, the New Zealand Council, and presides of its meetings and functions. Additionally the president chairs Labour's policy council and party list moderating committee. The president is paid an honorarium for their services.

History
The post of president of the Labour Party was officially created upon the party's inception in 1916, the inaugural holder was James McCombs. The longest serving president was James Roberts serving 13 years consecutively from 1937 to 1950. The first Maori holder was Charles Bennett (1973–76).

List of presidents
The following is a complete list of Labour Party presidents:

Notes

References

 

New Zealand Labour Party
Political office-holders in New Zealand
New Zealand politics-related lists